The Museum of World Cultures is an ethnological museum in Frankfurt, Germany.  Until 2001 it was called the Museum of Ethnology (Museum für Völkerkunde).

History

It was founded in 1904, as a civic institution, to bring together the ethnographic collections of the city of Frankfurt.  In 1908 the museum moved into the Palais Thurn und Taxis in the city centre.  In 1925 the city acquired the collections of the Institute of Cultural Morphology (today the Frobenius Institute), founded by the ethnologist Leo Frobenius. He relocated to Frankfurt along with the institute and become an honorary professor of the University of Frankfurt.  In 1934 he became the director of the museum.  The roles of museum director and institute director continued to be occupied by the same person (including Frobenius's successors) until 1966, when the university became state-run, since when the museum has again been run by the city.

Significant parts of the collection were lost when the Palais was destroyed by bombs in World War II.  However, some items had already been evacuated from the Palais – these survived the war, and in 1973 they were put on display in an old villa on the banks of the Main, where they have been ever since.  The Museum of World Cultures therefore counts as one of the earliest museums on what is now the Museumsufer.

The museum has expanded since 1973 and now occupies three adjacent buildings on the Schaumainkai – nos. 29 (the main building), 35 (the original villa), and 37 ("Gallery 37"), which were acquired and/or rebuilt in the 1980s.  The collections include over 65,000 objects from Oceania, Australia, Southeast Asia, the Americas, Africa and Europe. Gallery 37 hosts exhibitions of contemporary works by Indian, African, Oceanian and Indonesian artists.

In 2010, plans were announced for a new phase of construction to further expand the museum.

The directors of the Museum der Weltkulturen are:
 1904–1919: Bernhard Hagen
 1919–1935: Johannes Lehmann, Interimsdirektor
 1935–1938: Leo Frobenius
 1938–1939: Adolf E. Jensen, Interimsdirektor
 1940–1945: Karin Hissink
 1946–1965: Adolf E. Jensen
 1965–1966: Carl August Schmitz
 1966–1971: Herrmann Niggemeyer
 1972–1983: Heinz Kelm
 1984–1985: Johanna Agthe, Interimsdirektorin
 1985–1998: Franz Josef Thiel
 1998–2000: Johanna Agthe, Interimsdirektorin
 2000–2008: Anette Rein
 2008–2010: Christine Stelzig
 2010–2015: Clementine Deliss
 2015–2019: Eva Raabe, kommissarische Direktorin
 since 1 October 2019: Eva Raabe

See also 
 Museumsufer
 List of museums in Germany

Museumsufer 
Museum der Weltkulturen is part of the Museumsufer.

References

External links
 
 
 Journal Ethnologie, the museum's E-zine 

Museums in Frankfurt
Museums established in 1904
Ethnographic museums in Germany
Decorative arts museums in Germany
1904 establishments in Germany
Cross-cultural studies